Nomenia duodecimlineata is a moth in the family Geometridae first described by Alpheus Spring Packard in 1873. It is found in western North America, from British Columbia to California, Nevada, Arizona and New Mexico.

The wingspan is about 22 mm. The forewings are dark gray. Adults are on wing in spring.

Subspecies
Nomenia duodecimlineata duodecimlineata
Nomenia duodecimlineata secunda Pearsall, 1906

References

Moths described in 1873
Asthenini